The Yezo Group is a stratigraphic group in Hokkaido, Japan and Sakhalin, Russia which is primarily Late Cretaceous in age (Aptian to Earliest Paleocene). It is exposed as roughly north–south trending belt extending 1,500 kilometres through central Hokkaido from Urakawa to Cape Sōya and Sakhalin from the south coast to Alexandrovsk-Sakhalinsky District. It consists of marine forearc basin sediments, typically turbiditic and bioturbated mudstones and sandstones with subordinate conglomerate primarily deposited on the continental shelf and slope of the ancient Yezo subduction margin. It forms a continuous depositional sequence with the Sorachi Group, which overlies the Horokanai Ophiolite. The sequence gradually shallows upwards with the terminal Hakobuchi Formation representing a fluvial-inner shelf environment.

Numerous fossils are known from the unit, mostly ammonites and bivalves, but also marine vertebrates such as mosasaurs, plesiosaurs  and marine turtles. Dinosaur remains are among the fossils that have been recovered from the group. These include a partial cervical vertebra and right hand from the therizinosaurid Paralitherizinosaurus, from Early Campanian Osoushinai Formation from northern Hokkaido. Nipponosaurus is known from an unnamed unit of the group from Southern Sakhalin, probably late Santonian or early Campanian in age. Kamuysaurus, which is known from the early Maastrichtian Hakobuchi Formation of southern Hokkaido, was also discovered in layers of this group.

Fossil content

Paleofauna

Paleoflora

See also 
 List of dinosaur-bearing rock formations

References 

Geologic groups of Asia
Geologic formations of Japan
Geologic formations of Russia
Lower Cretaceous Series of Asia
Aptian Stage
Albian Stage
Upper Cretaceous Series of Asia
Cenomanian Stage
Turonian Stage
Coniacian Stage
Santonian Stage
Campanian Stage
Maastrichtian Stage
Cretaceous–Paleogene boundary
Paleogene System of Asia
Danian Stage
Mudstone formations
Sandstone formations
Tuff formations
Conglomerate formations
Paleontology in Japan
Paleontology in Russia